The 2006 JPMorgan Chase Open singles statistics are for the 2006 WTA Tour, a Women's Tennis Association (WTA) tennis competition.

Tournament

Kim Clijsters was the defending champion, but did not compete this year.

Elena Dementieva won the title, defeating Jelena Janković 6–3, 4–6, 6–4 in the final. It was her 2nd title of the year and the 6th title of her career.

Seeds
The top eight seeds received a bye into the second round.

Draw

Finals

Top half

Section 1

Section 2

Bottom half

Section 3

Section 4

See also 
 2006 ATP Tour
 WTA Tour
 List of female tennis players
 List of tennis tournaments

References

External links
 Main and Qualifying Draws

2006 WTA Tour